Maramon is a small town on the Pampa River, in Thiruvalla Sub-District & Taluk opposite to Kozhencherry  in the state of Kerala, India.
The nearest railway station is Chengannur  (13 km).
Maramon is about 16 km from the Thiruvalla Town headquarters, the town of Thiruvalla
The M. K. Road (Mavelikkara-Chengannur -Kozhencherry Road/SH-10) connects the town to other major towns.

The nearest airports are Cochin International Airport and Trivandrum International Airport.

Maramon Convention
Maramon is famous because of the Maramon Convention, the largest Christian gathering in Asia. Maramon is said to be the birthplace of Mar Thoma Syrian Church.

Villages
The following villages form a part of Maramon:-
Nedumprayar 
Chettimukku 
Chalaikara 
Thottapuzhassery.
Kurianoor
Mosco padi Maramon

Transport

The M. K. Road (Mavelikkara-Chengannur -Kozhencherry Road/SH-10) connects the town to other major towns.

The T. K. Road (Thiruvalla- -Kumbazha Road/SH-07) connects the town to other major towns.

Rail Connectivity
 
The nearest railway station is Chengannur  (13 km).

The nearest airports are Cochin International Airport and Trivandrum International Airport.

Christian Cultural Center
The town Maramon is generally recognized as center of Christian culture and influence in India. Among the churches in Maramon include the Maramon Marthoma Church, St. Mary's Orthodox Syrian Church (also known as Maramon Marthamariam Pazhaya Suriyani Palli),India Pentecostal Church of God, St. Joseph Catholic Church, and a few others. Maramon is also famous as the birthplace of Palakkunnathu Abraham Malpan (Malpan means teacher), leader of the reformation in the Syrian Church of Malankara in the 19th century. The Mar Thoma Sabha is headed by Most Rev. Philipose Mar Chrysostom Marthoma Metropolitan and Most Rev. Joseph Marthoma Metropolitan.im stupid like u

Maramon is not only renowned for Christian congregation, but also for banks of the river Pamba, and witnessing the Aranmula Snake Boat race. Moreover Maramon is famous for Hindus and Christian congregations like Jacobite, Catholic, Pentecostal   etc.

See also

Maramon Convention
Thottapuzhassery
 Aranmula Parthasarathy Temple 
 Chettimukku Devi Temple 
Thiruvalla
Thiruvanchamkave devi temple

References 

Villages in Pathanamthitta district
Villages in Thiruvalla taluk